Raúl Elias Ormeño Pacheco (born June 21, 1958) is a Chilean former football defensive midfielder.

Playing career
He played for only one club in Chile, Colo Colo.

At international level, he represented Chile at under-20 level in both the 1977 and the 1979 South American Championships.

At senior level, he represented his native country at the 1982 FIFA World Cup, wearing the number fourteen jersey. In total, he made 11 appearances for Chile and scored a goal versus El Salvador on 7 May 1989.

Coaching career
He was the manager of San Luis de Quillota in the Primera B between 2007 and 2008.

Personal life

Honours

Club
Colo-Colo
 Primera División (7): 1979, 1981, 1983, 1986, 1989, 1990, 1991
 Copa Chile (6): 1981, 1982, 1985, 1988, 1989, 1990
 Copa Libertadores (1): 1991

International
Chile
 Copa Expedito Teixeira (1): 1990

References

External links
 Weltfussball profile 

1958 births
Living people
People from Temuco
Chilean footballers
Chile international footballers
Chile under-20 international footballers
Colo-Colo footballers
Chilean Primera División players
Association football midfielders
1982 FIFA World Cup players
1989 Copa América players
Chilean football managers
San Luis de Quillota managers
Primera B de Chile managers